Masantol, officially the Municipality of Masantol, is a 2nd class municipality in the province of Pampanga, Philippines. According to the 2020 census, it has a population of 57,990 people.

Etymology
The municipality is named after the santol trees that used to grow abundantly in the area.

The reason is either because there was a proliferation of santol trees in the area, or because the town was where santol fruits were heavily bartered (Kapampangans being fond of 'sinigang' dish).

A legend of how the town got its name goes like this: 'A Spanish missionary came to the town for the first time. Upon reaching a roadside corner store, he parked his horse-driven vehicle and inquired from the store keeper the name of the place. A middle-aged woman vendor, believing that the Spanish priest was asking for the name of the fruits she was selling, readily responded in broken Spanish language, Padre, todos dulce Masantol. The priest took from his pocket a pencil and a small diary and wrote down the word mas santol, referring to the name of the place he has visited. At the time, the locality abounded with santol trees, and santol fruits were in season when the priest visited the place.

History

San Miguel de Masantol May 1, 1878
Originally named San Miguel de Masantol and a part of the town of Macabebe, three of the town's leading patriarchs - Manuel Fajardo, Gregorio Bautista, and Juan Lacap - filed a motion on June 26, 1877, to separate the barrios of Bebe, Bulacus, Caingin and Nigui from Macabebe thereby creating a new Spanish pueblo called San Miguel.  This new pueblo was approved by Spanish Governor General Domingo Moriones y Murillo and was inaugurated on May 1, 1878.  On November 30, 1893, the Catholic Parish of San Miguel was formally acknowledged through a Royal Decree. For a while it came to be known San Miguel Masantol, until popular usage reverted it to the original name.

Balen ning Masantol 1907
On July 26, 1904, Masantol once more became part of Macabebe. However, in 1907, Masantol was again reinstated as a separate independent municipality and this lasted up to the present.

The Battle of Bangkusay Channel The Ruler of Macabebe
Tarik Sulayman  Bambalino / Bankau or for some Historians the Unnamed ruler of Macabebe was the indigenous leader of Macabebe from the "Masantol area", who refused to ally with the Spaniards and therefore mounted an attack against the Spanish forces of Miguel López de Legazpi during the Battle of Bangkusay Channel on June 3, 1571. The Joint Force of Macabebe, Calumpit, Hagonoy and Maynila "Old Rajahnate of Maynila under Rajah Sulayman III / Rajah Mura/Muda of Manila" were defeated, by the Joint Force of Spanish Armada and Tagalog mercenaries and Tarik Sulayman himself was killed in the Battle, and Consequently, this victory enabled the Spaniards to establish themselves throughout the city "Territory of Kingdom of Tondo" and its neighboring Kingdoms and towns.

Tragedy
On January 7, 2008, one person drowned, another missing and 40 others were injured due to electric shocks, when a live cable hit the floating pagoda boat in the fluvial festival of Virgen La Purisima Concepcion at Barangay Alauli.

Geography
Masantol is almost surrounded by the municipality of Macabebe (For it was once a former part of the town). It is known to be the southernmost town in the province of Pampanga. It is bounded to the north by the municipality of Macabebe; to the east by the municipalities of Calumpit and Hagonoy in Bulacan; to the west by Macabebe; and to the south by some parts of Macabebe and Manila Bay.

Climate

Barangays
Masantol is politically subdivided into 26 barangays and 2 independent/dependent sitios.

Sitios:
 Bebe Arabia
 Sagrada 2 (sagrada dos)

Demographics

Religion 

The majority of the population are members of the Catholic church and each village or barangay has its own fiesta. The main Roman Catholic parish church of the town is the San Miguel Parish Church in Barangay San Nicolas, established in the late 20th century.

 80% One Holy Apostolic Catholic Church (Christian) (Roman rite)
 19% Evangelical, Pentecostal, Presbyterian, Jesus Is Lord Church, Protestant etc. (Christian Denomination)
 0.07% Iglesia Ni Cristo
 0.20% Islam (Sunni, Shia)
 0.10% others/non-believers/atheist

Economy

Festivals
 Batalla San Miguel Arkangel (Apung Igue) - May 8, All Masantolenos
 Battalla Santo Niño - every last Sunday of January. - Barangay Santo Nino
 Batalla Santa Monica - May 4. - Barangay Santa Monica Caingin
 Batalla San Roque de Montpelier (Apung Duque) - August 15,16,17 Sittio Bebe Arabia, Barangay Bebe Anac
 Batalla San Roque (Apung Duque) - 3rd or 4th Sunday of April - Sittio Bebe Arabia, Barangay Bebe Anac, Barangay Bebe Matua
 Batalla San Roque de Montpelier (Apung Duque) - August 15,16,17 Barangay Bebe Matua
 Fiesta de San Nicolas (Apung Culas) - May 12 and September 10  - Barangay San Nicolas
 Feast of The HOLY ROSARY - every 2nd Saturday of October in BULACUS MASANTOL
 Batalla de Santa Lucia (Apung Lucia) - December 13 of the year. - Barangay Santa Lucia Wakas, Matua, Anac
 Batalla de San Agustin (Apung Gustin)- August 28 Barangay San Agustin Caingin
 Limbun at Libad or Labas Larawan (Celebration of the Saints) in each barrio/barangay celebrating their patron saint for ones a week in January.

Education
Masantol is home to several primary, secondary, Vocational and Collage School among them are:
 Pampanga institute (Collage)
 TESDA Vocational Training Center (Under the Municipality support)
 San Miguel Academy Semi-Catholic School (Christian School) (Junior/Siñor High School)
 Holy Child of Mary Academy Semi-Catholic School (Christian School) (Junior/Siñor High School)
 Pampanga Institute (Junior/Siñor High School) 1st high school institution in town of Masantol 
 Masantol Central High School (Siñor High)
 Masantol National High School (Junior High) (fmr. Santa Lucia High School)
 Masantol High School Annex (Junior High) (Tarik Suliman High School)
 Masantol High School Annex (Junior High) (Malauli High School)
 St. Michael The Archangel Archdiocesan Parochial School Exclusive Catholic School (Masantol Parochial School)
 Masantol Elementary School (Masantol Central Elementary School)
 Bagang Elem. School
 Caingin Elem. School
 Palimpe Elem. School
 Bebe Anac Elem. School
 Bebe Matua Elem School
 Puti Elem. School
 Sagrada Elem. School
 Sua Elem. School
 San Isidro Elem. School
 Balibago Elem. School
 SantaLucia elem school
 Alauli Elem School
 San Pedro Elem School
 Santa Cruz Main Elem School
 Santa Cruz (Annex) Elem School
 San Nicolas Elem School
 Bagang Elem School
 Balibago Elem School
 Nigui Elem School

Gallery

References

External links

 Masantol Profile at PhilAtlas.com
 [ Philippine Standard Geographic Code]
Philippine Census Information
Local Governance Performance Management System

Municipalities of Pampanga
Populated places on the Pampanga River